Tsotsobe is a surname. Notable people with the surname include:

 Lonwabo Tsotsobe (born 1984), South African cricketer
 Nomsebenzi Tsotsobe (born 1978), South African rugby union player and model

Surnames of African origin